The Sant'Onofrio Altarpiece  is a painting by the Italian  Renaissance painter Luca Signorelli, housed in the Museo dell'Opera del Duomo in the Cathedral of Perugia, Italy. It was painted for the church in 1484, commissioned by bishop Jacopo Vagnucci, a native of Cortona, Signorelli's birthplace.

Description
The scene portrayed is a Holy Conversation, with a high throne where the Virgin and Child sit, placed over a Classical-style pedestal and crowned by a small engraved arch featuring a festoon with vegetables. Mary is reading a Bible, while Jesus holds a white lily, symbolizing her virginity and purity.

Over a gilded step are St. John the Baptist and St. Lawrence, surmounted by two flying angels. On the marble step below, Signorelli portrayed a sitting angel playing a lute, perhaps a homage to elements typical of the contemporary Venetian school (such as the San Cassiano Altarpiece by Antonello da Messina). The angel resembles one painted by Signorelli in the Basilica della Santa Casa, at Loreto, a few years earlier. Standing on the foreground pavement are St. Onuphrius and St. Herculanus, the patrons of Perugia.

Influences in the style of the painting include Ercole de' Roberti's Santa Maria di Porto Altarpiece, Donatello and Filippo Lippi (in the fierce figure of Lawrence) and, in the figure of Herculanus, that of Piero della Francesca's St. Augustine.

Sources

Paintings by Luca Signorelli
1484 paintings
Paintings of the Madonna and Child
Paintings depicting John the Baptist
Angels in art
Paintings in Perugia
Altarpieces
Books in art
Musical instruments in art